François Joseph Eugène Napoléon de Noailles (25 December 1866 in Paris – 8 May 1900 in Paris) 10th Prince de Poix, was a French nobleman.

Son of Antonin-Just-Léon-Marie de Noailles (1841–1909), Duke de Mouchy, and Princess Anne Murat (1841–1924), he was married on 29 June 1889, to Madeleine Marie Isabelle Dubois de Courval (1870–1944), daughter of Arthur Dubois, Viscount de Courval (1826-1873) and his American wife Mary Ray (1835-1901).

They had four children:
 Henri-Antoine-Marie de Noailles (1890–1947), Duke de Mouchy, who married (in 1920) Marie de La Rochefoucauld (1901–1983)
 Arthur Anne Marie Charles de Noailles (1891–1981), Viscount de Noailles, who married (in 1923) Marie-Laure de Noailles (1902-1970)
 Antoine Henri Alexis Marie de Noailles (born and died in 1893)
 Philippine Marie Cécile Douce de Noailles (1898–1991), who married (in 1917) Eugène, 11th Prince of Ligne (1893–1960)

Princes of Poix
Dukes of Noailles
Dukes of Mouchy
Dukes of Poix
Counts of Noailles
Francois Joseph Eugene Napoleon
1866 births
1900 deaths
Heirs apparent who never acceded